Anna Munzenmaier (née Watson) is a fitness model and former cheerleader at the University of Georgia. She has been referred to as the "World's Strongest Cheerleader". She previously attended Hawaii Pacific University, and was also a cheerleader there.

Watson is from Fayetteville, Georgia.

She has been participating in gymnastics since she was five years old, and started cheerleading her sophomore year of high school.

She picked up weight-lifting while a student at Hawaii Pacific University. Watson can squat 255 lbs, dead lift 230, curl 35 in each hand, and bench press 155 pounds.

Watson gained notability when she was reportedly offered a $75,000 contract from Elite Model Management to serve as a fitness model, but declined because the agency would require her to take legal steroids to enhance her muscle size. She shared with Robin Roberts on Good Morning America and reporters from Inside Edition that taking steroids would be against her religious and personal beliefs, even though she was later accused by certain tabloids and talk show hosts of taking steroids to enhance her performance.

References 

Living people
Year of birth missing (living people)
American cheerleaders
Georgia Bulldogs and Lady Bulldogs athletes
Hawaii Pacific University
Female models from Georgia (U.S. state)
American female bodybuilders
People from Fayetteville, Georgia
Sportspeople from the Atlanta metropolitan area
21st-century American women